The Benedict XVI Interdiocesan Major Seminary (French: Grand séminaire interdiocésain Benoît XVI) is a Roman Catholic seminary in Tchitchao, near Kara in Togo.

Rectors
2016 - Timothée Kpenu

References

Catholic Church in Togo
Catholic seminaries in Africa
Education in Togo
Kara Region